Safe + Sound is the third album by rapper/producer DJ Quik. It was released on February 21, 1995, on Profile Records. It peaked at number 14 on the Billboard 200 on March 11, 1995, number 1 on the Top R&B/Hip-Hop Albums chart the same date, and was certified Gold by the RIAA on July 11, 1995. The album was executive-produced by Suge Knight. The album featured the singles "Safe + Sound" and "Summer Breeze". A music video was produced for "Safe + Sound".

Track listing 

 signifies an additional producer.

Personnel
Credits for Safe + Sound adapted from AllMusic.

 George Archie - Composer, Drums, Instrumental, Liner Notes, Multi Instruments, Producer, Background Vocals
 Del Atkins - Bass
 Robert Bacon - Bass, Composer, Guitar, Producer
 Darius Barnett - Composer
 Larry Blackmon - Composer
 David Blake -  Primary Artist, Producer, Vocals, Bass, Composer, Drum Programming, Drums, Instrumental, Multi Instruments, Strings, Synthesizer, Talk Box
 Courtney Branch - Producer
 Byron Byrd - Composer
 Warryn Campbell - Electric Piano, Strings
 Crystal Cerrano - Vocals, Background Vocals
 George Clinton - Composer
 Kenneth Crouch - Piano, Electric Piano
 Alex Al - Bass
 Dave Foreman - Guitar

 LaSalle Gabriel - Guitar
 Reggie Green - Piano, Background Vocals
 Charles Greene - Flute, Saxophone
 J. J. Jackson - Composer
 Tracy Kendrick - Producer
 Suge Knight - Executive Producer
 Dionne Knighton - Vocals
 K. McCord - Composer
 Marvin McDaniel - Guitar
 Kelton McDonald - Vocals
 Rebecca Meek - Art Direction, Design
 Garry Shider - Vocals
 Norma Vega - Background Vocals
 Crawford Wilkerson - Vocals
 Bernie Worrell - Piano

Charts

Weekly charts

Year-end charts

Certifications

See also
List of number-one R&B albums of 1995 (U.S.)

References 

1995 albums
DJ Quik albums
Albums produced by Courtney Branch
Albums produced by DJ Quik
Albums produced by G-One
G-funk albums
Profile Records albums
West Coast hip hop albums